Los Shadows is an extended play 45 rpm record released by The Shadows.  It reached #4 in the UK EP charts in 1963.

Description
The four songs chosen, as well as the title of the record, have a definite Spanish and Latinamerican flavor to them; the author of Granada  (a town in Spain), Agustín Lara, was Mexican, Julio César Sanders, author of Adios Muchachos (Pablo the Dreamer) was Argentinian, while the lyricist, César Vedani, is not credited on the Shadows instrumental version. José Padilla, who composed "Valencia" (another town in Spain) in 1924 and Augusto Algueró author of Las Tres Carabelas, were Spaniards.

Track listing
Side 1
Granada (Lara)
Adios Muchachos (Pablo the Dreamer) (Sanders)

Side 2
Valencia (Padilla)
Las Tres Carabelas (Three Galleons) (Alguero Jr.)

Personnel 
 Hank Marvin – Lead guitar
 Bruce Welch – Rhythm guitar
 Brian Locking – Bass guitar
 Brian Bennett – Drums
 Norrie Paramor Strings

The record was recorded in Barcelona on April 27, 1963.

References

1963 EPs
The Shadows EPs
EMI Columbia Records EPs